The Lodhi Fort is a citadel in the city of Ludhiana, Punjab, India. The fortress is located on the banks of the river Sutlej and contains a tunnel to leading to the neighboring town of Phillaur. It was built over 500 years ago during the reign of the Sikandar Lodi and was well-maintained under the reign of Ranjit Singh and the British after him, but then fell into disrepair. It was declared a state-protected monument in December 2013.

The Government Institute of Textile Chemistry and Knitting Technology was initially based in the fort campus which is now shifted to the new address at Z - Block, Rishi Nagar, Ludhiana.

See also 
 Lodi dynasty
 Phillaur Fort
 Sikandar Lodi was an Afghan Sultan of the Delhi Sultanate between 1489 and 1517.

References 

Buildings and structures in Ludhiana
Forts in Punjab, India
Fortifications